Monterrein is a former commune in the Morbihan department of Brittany in north-western France. On 1 January 2019, it was merged into the commune Ploërmel. Inhabitants of Monterrein are called in French Monterrinois.

See also
Communes of the Morbihan department

References

External links

Former communes of Morbihan